Bezliudivka is an urban-type settlement located in Kharkiv Raion of  Kharkiv Oblast in eastern Ukraine. It is adjacent to the southern boundary of the city of Kharkiv and is situated on the Udy River (Seversky Donets Basin), 3 km from the railway stop. Bezliudivka hosts the administration of Bezliudivka settlement hromada, one of the hromadas of Ukraine. Population: 

Lake Nahorivske and Lake Pidborivske are located in the settlement.

History 
Bezlyudivka was first mentioned in 1681. 

It was a village in Kharkov uyezd of Kharkov Governorate of the Russian Empire.

In 1938 it was classified as an urban-type settlement.

It is estimated that 988 inhabitants of Bezludivka had fought in the World War II, 124 of them died, 798 were awarded orders and medals of the Soviet Union.

In 1964 the Sovkhoz "Bezliudivsky" was formed here.

In January 1989 the population was 10 387 people. 

In January 2013 the population was 9698 people.

In January 2018 the population was 9436 people.

Economy and culture 
Bezliudivka is located near a large sand quarry. There is a Judicial Lyceum, another lyceum, clinic, library, club.

References

External links
  Information about urban village Bezliudivka on the Parliament of Ukraine site
 Map of settlement on English
 A book about the history of Bezlyudivka

Urban-type settlements in Kharkiv Raion
Populated lakeshore places in Ukraine
Kharkovsky Uyezd